Shahrokh Sultan Zanganeh (died 1639), was a Kurdish aristocrat who belonged to the Zanganeh tribe, a Sunni Kurdish tribe native to the Kermanshah Province. Not much is known about Shahrokh Sultan. In 1639, he became the chieftain of the Zanganeh tribe, but died during the same year. He was succeeded by his brother Shaykh Ali Khan Zanganeh.

Sources 
 
 

People from Kermanshah
Iranian Kurdish people
Zanganeh
History of Kermanshah Province
Safavid governors
1639 deaths
17th-century people of Safavid Iran
17th-century Kurdish people